Innocent is a 2011 television drama film directed by Mike Robe, starring Alfred Molina, Bill Pullman, and Marcia Gay Harden, based on Scott Turow's 2010 novel, a sequel to Presumed Innocent. In the film, Judge Rusty Sabich (Pullman) is charged with the murder of his wife Barbara (Harden) twenty years after being cleared in the death of his mistress. Robe previously directed The Burden of Proof, another sequel to Presumed Innocent, but which focused on the character Sandy Stern.

Alan J. Pakula directed the film based on Turow's first novel, Presumed Innocent, a 1990 box office hit that starred Harrison Ford, Brian Dennehy, Raul Julia and Greta Scacchi.

Plot summary

Bill Pullman plays Judge Rusty Sabich, who is romantically involved with a colleague and on trial for murder: This time he is accused of killing his wife, Barbara (Marcia Gay Harden). His accuser is his old nemesis Tommy Molto (Richard Schiff), while his longtime friend and lawyer, Sandy Stern (Alfred Molina), is in charge of the defense.

Cast
 Bill Pullman as Rozat "Rusty" Sabich. Played by Harrison Ford in Presumed Innocent.
 Alfred Molina as Alejandro "Sandy" Stern. Played by Raúl Juliá in Presumed Innocent.
 Marcia Gay Harden as Barbara Sabich. Played by Bonnie Bedelia in Presumed Innocent.
 Tahmoh Penikett as Jimmy Brand
 Mariana Klaveno as Anna Vostick
 Richard Schiff as Tommy Molto. Played by Joe Grifasi in Presumed Innocent.
 Benita Ha as Dr. Stack
 Catherine Lough Haggquist as Detective Rory Gissling
 Nicole Oliver as Elaine Reese
 Jarod Joseph as Orestes Mauro
 Callard Harris as Nat Sabich. Played by Jesse Bradford in Presumed Innocent.
 Andrea Stefancikova as Waitress
 Don Ackerman as John Harnason
 Craig March as Marco Cantu
 Cameron K. Smith as Bailiff Armstrong
 Mark Steinberg as Lawyer

References

External links 
 
 

Kindle County
2011 television films
2011 films
TNT Network original films
American legal drama films
Lionsgate films
Films directed by Mike Robe
American drama television films
2010s English-language films
2010s American films